Ice hockey is a minor sport that is gaining popularity in Japan. Baseball and football (soccer)  have dominated Japanese sports for decades, but ice hockey has been less popular in Japan since its founding in the 1920s. It is governed by the Japan Ice Hockey Federation.

National and International Competitions

Japan Ice Hockey League

The Japan Ice Hockey League (JIHL)  was the national league in the country from 1966-2004, when it folded in favor of the international Asia League. Only Japanese teams were allowed to compete, and there were only six teams at any time in the league.

All Japan Ice Hockey Championship

Since 1933, a cup competition, the All Japan Ice hockey Championship has been held, in which four teams compete. It has been held annually since the 1930s and is one of the oldest sporting competitions in the country. A women’s counterpart has been held since 1982.

International Competitions
Japan has men’s, women’s and junior national teams. The Japan women's national team qualified for the 2014 Winter Olympics in Sochi and the 2018 Winter Olympics in PyeongChang, South Korea.

References